Dmitrov is a town and the administrative center of Dmitrovsky District in Moscow Oblast, Russia, located  to the north of Moscow on the Yakhroma River and the Moscow Canal. Population:

History

Dmitrov is one of the oldest urban areas in Moscow oblast. The town was originally founded by Yury Dolgoruky in 1154,  where his son Vsevolod was born. Its name is explained by the fact that Vsevolod's patron saint was St. Demetrius.

In the 13th century, the settlement marked a point where the borders of the Grand Duchy of Moscow, Tver, and Pereslavl-Zalessky converged. The settlement itself belonged to the princes of Galich-Mersky, located much to the north, until 1364, when it was incorporated into the Grand Duchy of Moscow. Both Dmitry Donskoy and his grandson Vasily II granted Dmitrov as an appanage to their younger sons, so Dmitrov was the capital of a tiny principality. In 1374, it was given town rights.

The reign of Ivan III's son Yury Ivanovich (1503–1533) inaugurated the golden age of Dmitrov. It is during his reign that the black-domed Assumption Cathedral in the kremlin and a smaller monastery cathedral of Sts. Boris and Gleb were built. Thereafter, the town passed to Yury's brother, Andrey of Staritsa. In 1569, it was seized from Vladimir of Staritsa, added to the Oprichnina and consequently went into a decline. The town suffered further damage during the Time of Troubles, when it was ransacked by the Poles.

In 1812, Dmitrov was briefly occupied by the Grande Armée. The Anarchist prince Peter Kropotkin spent his last years there after the Russian Revolution. In the 1930s, the local kremlin was excavated by Soviet archaeologists. In November 1941, German troops occupied the town and crossed the Moscow-Volga Canal from there.

Administrative and municipal status
Within the framework of administrative divisions, Dmitrov serves as the administrative center of Dmitrovsky District. As an administrative division, it is, together with eighty rural localities, incorporated within Dmitrovsky District as the Town of Dmitrov. As a municipal division, the Town of Dmitrov is incorporated within Dmitrovsky Municipal District as Dmitrov Urban Settlement.

Transportation
Dmitrov is a railway junction of the Moscow (Savyolovsky terminal)–Savyolovo branch and the Dmitrov–Alexandrov branch. The railway provides an efficient service to Moscow. Dmitrov is also a cargo port on the Moscow Canal.

Bus routes connect Dmitrov with Moscow (Altufyevo), Sergiyev Posad, Dubna, Taldom, Lobnya, Laryovo, and other destinations.

Twin towns – sister cities

Dmitrov is twinned with:

 Bytom, Poland
 Flevoland, Netherlands
 Osimo, Italy
 Piła, Poland
 Pitsunda, Georgia
 Puchavichy District, Belarus
 Rems-Murr (district), Germany
 Rēzekne, Latvia
 Rîbnița District, Moldova
 Yahotyn Raion, Ukraine

Miscellaneous
In a national competition in 2005, Dmitrov was recognized as the best-run town in Russia.
 t.A.T.u. shot their video for Nas Ne Dagoniat (Not Gonna Get Us) in Dmitrov

References

Notes

Sources

External links

Official website of Dmitrov 
Dmitrov Business Directory 

Cities and towns in Moscow Oblast
Populated places in Dmitrovsky District, Moscow Oblast
Dmitrovsky Uyezd (Moscow Governorate)
Golden Ring of Russia
Populated places established in the 12th century
1154 establishments in Europe
12th-century establishments in Russia